The Rio Verde (Portuguese for "green river") is a river of São Paulo state in southeastern Brazil.

Course

The Rio Verde basin is in the Juréia-Itatins Ecological Station, in the municipality of Iguape, São Paulo.
The river rises in the Juréia Massif, which descends steeply to the Atlantic Ocean to the south east.
The Rio Verde has clear water fed by the waterfalls of Juréia.

Conservation

In the late 1970s the Department of the Environment planned to develop a "green" housing project on the banks of the Rio Verde.
The project was cancelled in the 1980s when the Empresa Nuclebrás Brasileira decided to build the Iguape 4 and Iguape 5 power plants in a  area that included the entire Serra da Juréia. By law, the area surrounding the nuclear power plant would have to be made an ecological station.
The power plant project was abandoned but the Juréia-Itatins Ecological Station was created on 20 January 1986, covering the Juréia Massif and the entire watershed of the Una do Prelado River.

See also
List of rivers of São Paulo

References

Sources

Rivers of São Paulo (state)